Callulops boettgeri, also known as Boettger's Callulops frog, is a species of frog in the family Microhylidae. It is endemic to Halmahera in the Maluku Islands (the Moluccas) of Indonesia. It is only known from the holotype collected from Galela in 1894. The genus-level placement of this little known frog has changed many times, and it is still unclear whether it should be placed in some other genus.

Etymology
The specific name boettgeri honours Oskar Boettger, a German zoologist. Boettger was the first to study the type specimen, which he identified as Phrynixalus montanus (=Cophixalus montanus).

Description
The eyes are large and protuberant. The tympanum is somewhat distinct. The fingers are long and bear relatively large discs. The toes discs are also well-developed but smaller than the finger ones. No webbing is present. The dorsal ground color is brown. There is a yellowish-white stripe running from snout to cloacal opening. Dark dorsal markings include a W-shaped mark in the scapular region and dark flecks on each side of the central light stripe. Large, rounded reddish-brown markings are present on the sides of the head and body. The ventral side is light brown, with chestnut-brown spots on the chin, throat, chest, and undersides of limbs.

Habitat and conservation
This species presumably lives in rainforest and breeds by direct development, (i.e, there is no free-living larval stage), as other Callulops (and asterophryinids in general).

Threats to this species are unknown. The type locality is not within a protected area.

References

boettgeri
Frogs of Asia
Amphibians of Indonesia
Endemic fauna of Indonesia
Fauna of Halmahera
Amphibians described in 1901
Taxa named by Lajos Méhelÿ
Taxonomy articles created by Polbot